Miguel Ángel Clemente Solano (born 19 December 1969 in Murcia) is a cyclist from Spain.

Personal 
He has a vision impairment.  In 2013, he was awarded the bronze Real Orden al Mérito Deportivo.

Cycling 
He competed at the 2004 Summer Paralympics in cycling. He competed at the 2012 Summer Paralympics in cycling, winning  a bronze in the men's visually impaired team pursuit race while racing with guide cyclist Diego Javier Muñoz.

References

External links 
 
 

1969 births
Living people
Spanish male cyclists
Paralympic cyclists of Spain
Paralympic bronze medalists for Spain
Paralympic medalists in cycling
Cyclists at the 2004 Summer Paralympics
Cyclists at the 2012 Summer Paralympics
Medalists at the 2012 Summer Paralympics
Sportspeople from Murcia
Cyclists from the Region of Murcia